Roller Derby France represents France in women's international roller derby, in events such as the Roller Derby World Cup. The team was first formed to compete at the 2011 Roller Derby World Cup, and finished the tournament in seventh place.

Head coach Amelia Scareheart stated that the team's aim was to gain experience to strengthen itself for future contests. The team brought around a dozen supporters to the World Cup in Toronto.

France won their first round bout against Team Brazil, by 212 points to 138, but lost to Team England by 383 to 14 in the quarter final. In the placement round, they beat Team New Zealand 180 to 129, to finish in seventh place.

Team roster

2011 team roster
The initial roster was selected from about forty applicants by the coaching staff of the team: Amelia Scareheart, Bravehurt, Dixie Pixie and Slash Gordon.
(league affiliations listed as of at the time of the announcement)

References

France
Roller derby
Roller derby in France
2011 establishments in France
Sports clubs established in 2011